Braden Barrie is a singer/songwriter from Lindsay, Ontario, Canada. He is currently working under the name SayWeCanFly.

Career
Barrie began performing under the stage name SayWeCanFly in 2009, a name created by Landon Hagemann and Fred Kwon, Barrie's former classmates. In 2013, Barrie released an EP titled Heaven Is Hell. SayWeCanFly was ranked number three on Alternative Press's 2013 Readers Poll: Best AP&R Band.

In January 2015, Barrie released his debut album titled Between the Roses.

SayWeCanFly performed as part of Warped Tour in 2015.  He then embarked on a European and UK tour in early 2016, featuring co-headliners Tonight Alive and Set It Off, as well as The Ready Set.

SayWeCanFly released their third full album, ‘’Beautiful Mess’’, in 2018.

Discography

As SayWeCanFly

Studio albums
Between the Roses (2015) 
Blessed Are Those (2016)
Beautiful Mess (2018)

EPs
Will I Make it to the Big Time, Brother Landon? (2010)
Sleepy Time EP (2011)
Home (2011)
Dandelion Necklace EP (2012)
Riverside Drive Memories (2012)
Landon the Founder: My Life (2012)
Heaven Is Hell (2013)
Anything but Beautiful (2013)
Darling (2015)
Storyteller Unplugged (2017)
Nosebleed (2020)

As Braden Barrie

Studio albums
Limitless (2018)

Podcast

 Coffee Thoughts Podcast (2014–present)

References

1994 births
Living people
21st-century Canadian male singers